The Lorne sausage, also known as square sausage or slice, is a traditional Scottish food item made from minced meat, rusk and spices. Although termed a sausage, no casing is used to hold the meat in shape, hence it is usually served as square slices from a formed block. It is a common component of the traditional Scottish breakfast.

Name 
It is thought that the sausage is named after the  region of Lorne in Argyll; advertisements for 'Lorne Sausage' have been found in newspapers as early as 1896. This was long before comedian Tommy Lorne, after whom the sausage has been said to be named, became well-known.

History
The exact origins of the Lorne sausage remain unclear. It is often eaten in the Scottish variant of the full breakfast or in a breakfast roll. The sausage is also an appropriate size to make a sandwich using a slice from a plain loaf of bread cut in half.

Preparation
Square sausage has no casing, unlike traditional sausages, and must be tightly packed into the mould to hold it together; slices are often not truly square.

Occasionally, it has a length of caseless black pudding or haggis through the middle, in the style of a gala pie.

See also
 List of sausages
 Breakfast sausage
 Scrapple
 Goetta

References 

Scottish sausages
Scottish cuisine
Sliced foods
Meat and grain sausages